Kurovskoye is a town in Orekhovo-Zuyevsky District of Moscow Oblast, Russia, located on the Nerskaya River (Moskva's tributary)  southeast of Moscow. Population:

History
It was first mentioned in the 16th century as a small settlement of Kurovsky. In 1646, it was mentioned as the village of Kurovskaya. In 1952, it was renamed Kurovskoye and granted town status.

Administrative and municipal status
Within the framework of administrative divisions, it is incorporated within Orekhovo-Zuyevsky District as the Town of Kurovskoye. As a municipal division, the Town of Kurovskoye is incorporated within Orekhovo-Zuyevsky Municipal District as Kurovskoye Urban Settlement.

Religion

Geographically, Kurovskoye is located in what historically used to be the area of Guslitsa. The overwhelming majority of the population of the village of Kurovskaya were Old Believers. Presently, Kurovskoye is home to Guslitsky Spaso-Preobrazhensky Monastery (Russian Orthodox Church) and a Yedinoveriye Church of John Climacus.

References

Notes

Sources

Cities and towns in Moscow Oblast